Backsliders are a three piece Australian blues based band. The current line up consists of guitarist/vocalist Dom Turner and drummer/percussionist Rob Hirst joined on alternating nights by either Brod Smith, Ian Collard or Joe Glover on harmonica.

History

1986-2010: Formation 
In the early 1980s, Dom Turner and harmonica player Rex Hill began gigging around Sydney as an acoustic blues duo. After returning from the United States in 1986, enthused by the idea of blurring the lines between rural and urban blues, Dom began rehearsing a new rural blues band concept with drummer Peter Burgess in duo mode, which moved to the inclusion of Rex Hill on harmonica. The sound drew inspiration from the Mississippi Fred McDowell records where Fred was accompanied by a drummer, or a rural blues version of the sound Beausoleil achieved without bass guitar. The name 'Backsliders' came from a Library of Congress recording of Lead Belly singing "Backslider Fare you Well".

After a short stint of rehearsals, and a run of early local gigs, the newly formed band was offered a live performance at the Sydney Town Hall for radio station 2MBS FM (host to Stormy Monday blues Program) by blues DJ Austin Harrison scheduled for August 1987. The band played in duo mode (Dom and Peter) and directly after the performance was approached by the station label manager with an offer of an album release to be the first blues album on the 2MBS FM music label. The debut album Preaching Blues was released in 1988. The band continued to gig locally in Sydney, particularly around the Balmain/Rozelle area of Sydney including a residency at the Bridge Hotel, Rozelle. In 1989 Rex Hill resigned from the band.

As both Dom and Pete were fans of Captain Matchbox Whoopee Band, Jim Conway was contacted as replacement for Rex. Jim agreed to join on harmonica (Jim had filled in for a Rex at a number of gigs in late 1988). A follow up album Sitting on a Million was recorded and released in 1989 and the band quickly moved onto the Australian music festival circuit beginning with the Port Fairy Folk Festival, The East Coast Blues Festival and the Woodford Folk Festival as well as touring Australia, in particular travelling to Melbourne and regional Victoria as a strong live blues music circuit had developed in that region of Australia. 

Throughout the 1990s the band continued on the touring circuit as well as playing a number of residency gigs in Sydney, including the Rose Shamrock and Thistle Hotel in Rozelle. The band also took advantage of the various television opportunities available to independent music acts in the 1990s, performing live on a variety of daytime and evening news and variety programs.

After meeting at a 1996 recording session Dom became friends with drummer Rob Hirst and was asked to join Backsliders. A very brief rehearsal followed and Rob and agreed officially joining in 2000, however with the understanding that there were to be some upcoming Midnight Oil commitments. Drummers Angus Diggs and Ashley Davies filled the drum role during Rob's occasional absences, however with the disbandment of Midnight Oil in 2002, Rob was able to focus on touring, writing and playing with Backsliders. In 2000, drummer Peter Burgess resigned.

In 2006, Jim Conway resigned from the group. Broderick Smith (Dingoes, Big Combo) and Ian Collard (Collard Greens and Gravy) took the harmonica role at alternate gigs. In 2010, Joe Glover (Shelley's Murder Boys) added to the harmonica team.

2011-present:  
At the ARIA Music Awards of 2011, was nominated for ARIA Award for Best Blues and Roots Album

Their 2020 album, Bonecrunch, was described by the Sydney Morning Herald as "in the hands of these vets the blues element isn’t staid, but is led down different, swampy paths to create something new and, indeed, hopeful."

Discography

Studio albums

Live albums

Compilation albums

Extended plays

Awards and nominations

ARIA Music Awards
The ARIA Music Awards is an annual awards ceremony that recognises excellence, innovation, and achievement across all genres of Australian music. They commenced in 1987.

! 
|-
| ARIA Music Awards of 1999
| Poverty Deluxe
| ARIA Award for Best Blues and Roots Album
| 
| rowspan="3"| 
|-
| ARIA Music Awards of 2002
| Hanoi
| Best Blues and Roots Album
| 
|-
| ARIA Music Awards of 2011
| Starvation Box
| Best Blues and Roots Album
| 
|-

References

External links 
 

Australian folk music groups
Australian indie rock groups